The McFarland Carillon, sometimes referred to as the McFarland Bell Tower or McFarland Memorial Bell Tower is a  bell tower located on the South Quad of the University of Illinois at Urbana-Champaign.  The tower was approved by the University's trustees in 2005 and built in 2008-2009. It was designed by Fred Guyton of Peckham, Guyton, Albers & Viets. The carillon has 48 bells.

History and description

The carillon project began as an attempt to upgrade and renovate the Altgeld Chimes of Altgeld Hall Tower, until it became clear that this would not be possible. A free-standing campanile had been considered as a possibility for the campus since 1913. The funding for the project came from Harold Richard "Dick" McFarland, a graduate from the university's College of Agriculture in 1952. After the death of his wife Sarah "Sally" McFarland due to ovarian cancer, McFarland donated $1.5 million for the construction of the tower, which would be named in her honor.

The carillon's 48 bells were cast by the Petit & Fritsen bell foundry and were transported to the United States via boat. The total cost of the bells was estimated at $550,000.

Local residents and students have attempted to climb the tower, and at least one has fallen while attempting the climb.

"Eye of Sauron" prank
In the early hours of Sunday, September 21, 2008, students hung a replica of the "Eye of Sauron" in the top half of the tower. The eye is from J. R. R. Tolkien's novel The Lord of the Rings and is a symbol of the principal antagonist. The University of Illinois Police did not identify the pranksters. The eye was removed from the tower the next morning.

See also

References

External links 

 Entry on TowerBells.org

bell towers in the United States
buildings and structures of the University of Illinois Urbana-Champaign
carillons
clock towers in Illinois
tourist attractions in Champaign County, Illinois
towers completed in 2009